Agil Mammadov (born 1 May 1989 in Nakhchivan) is an Azerbaijani professional footballer who plays as a goalkeeper for Neftchi Baku in the Azerbaijan Premier League.

Career

Club
Mammadov played for FK Baku in a qualifier for the 2008–09 UEFA Champions League.

On 4 December 2014, Mammadov left FK Baku after not being paid by the club.

On 24 July 2016, Mammadov signed with AZAL PFK.

On 5 June 2017, Mammadov signed a one-year contract with Gabala FK. Leaving the club on 29 December 2017, with Neftchi Baku announced the signing of Mammadov on a contract until the end of the 2017–18 season, with the option of an additional year.

On 7 January 2019, Mammadov returned to Neftchi Baku from Gabala for his third stint with the club, signing an 18-month contract.

International
Mammadov represented the Azerbaijan national under-21 football team.

Career statistics

International

Statistics accurate as of match played 17 November 2015

Honours
FK Baku
Azerbaijan Premier League (1): 2008–09
Azerbaijan Cup (2): 2009–10, 2011–12

References

External links 

Azerbaijani footballers
Association football goalkeepers
1989 births
Living people
FC Baku players
AZAL PFK players
Azerbaijan Premier League players
People from Nakhchivan
Neftçi PFK players
Azerbaijan international footballers
Azerbaijan under-21 international footballers